Poland competed at the 1950 European Athletics Championships in Brussels, Belgium, from 23-27 August 1950. A delegation of 3 athletes were sent to represent the country. Polish athletes did not achieve any medal first time in history.

References

European Athletics Championships
1950
Nations at the 1950 European Athletics Championships